Soltanabad (also Romanized as Solţānābād; also known as Kalāteh-ye Soltānābad and Solţānābād-e Esmā‘īl) is a village in Miyan Velayat Rural District, in the Central District of Mashhad County, Razavi Khorasan Province, Iran. At the 2006 census, its population was 224, in 73 families.

References 

Populated places in Mashhad County